Alastair MacGregor Martin is a former rugby union international who represented Chile in the late 1970s and early 1980s. He was noted as one of the finest players in Chile and as such was selected to play for a World XV against Argentina in 1980.

Early life
Alastair MacGregor Martin was born on 30 June 1954 and attended The Mackay School in Chile.

Rugby career
Alastair MacGregor Martin played his club rugby for his school's old boys club, the Old Mackayans Rugby Football Club, and led them to national cup wins on 1978, 1981 and 1982.

For Chile, he first faced the Pumas in 1977 and by 1979 was captain of his national side. He was also part of the 1980 South American Jaguars side that toured South Africa. Notably, in 1980 he also played for a World XV on 9 August 1980 against  in Buenos Aires, losing 36-22. alongside John Scott and Jean-Pierre Rives.

In 2009 he became the president of the Federación de Rugby de Chile (FERUCHI) replacing Carlos Silva Echiburu. This was in response to what was described as a messy institutional period, when the Chilean rugby chiefs looked to one of the countries former rugby greats to lead the new road.

Career
Alastair MacGregor Martin is an engineer by profession.

References

1954 births
Living people
Chilean people of Scottish descent
Chilean rugby union players
Rugby union number eights
Chile international rugby union players